In the fields of atomic, molecular, and optical science, the term light dressed state refers to a quantum state of an atomic or molecular system interacting with a laser light
in terms of the Floquet picture, i.e. roughly like an atom or a molecule plus a photon. The Floquet picture is based on the Floquet theorem in differential equations with periodic coefficients.

Mathematical formulation

The Hamiltonian of a system of charged particles interacting with a laser light can be expressed as

where  is the vector potential of the electromagnetic field of the laser;
The position and momentum of the -th 
 is the speed of light.
By virtue of this time-periodicity of the laser field, the total Hamiltonian is also 
periodic in time as

The Floquet theorem guarantees that any solution  of the 
Schrödinger equation with this type of Hamiltonian,

can be expressed in the form

where  has the same time-periodicity as the Hamiltonian,

Therefore, this part can be expanded in a Fourier series, obtaining

where  is the frequency of the laser field. 
This expression (2) reveals that a quantum state of the system governed by the Hamiltonian (1) 
can be specified by a real number  and an integer .

The integer  in eq. (2) can be regarded as the number of photons 
absorbed from (or emitted to) the laser field.
In order to prove this statement, we clarify the correspondence between the solution (2),
which is derived from the classical expression of the electromagnetic field where there
is no concept of photons, and one which is derived from a quantized electromagnetic field (see quantum field theory). 
(It can be verified that  is equal to the expectation value of the absorbed photon number

References 
 
 
 
 
 
 F.H.M. Faisal, Theory of Multiphoton Processes, Plenum (New York) 1987 .

See also 
Quantum mechanics
Hamiltonian (quantum mechanics)

Quantum mechanics